Haut-Intyamon is a municipality in the district of Gruyère in the Canton of Fribourg in Switzerland. The municipalities of Albeuve, Lessoc, Montbovon and Neirivue formed it on 1 January 2002.

Geography

Of this area,  or 49.4% is used for agricultural purposes, while  or 37.9% is forested.

Of the built up area, housing and buildings made up 1.0% and transportation infrastructure made up 1.2%.  Out of the forested land, 33.1% of the total land area is heavily forested and 3.6% is covered with orchards or small clusters of trees.  Of the agricultural land, 10.7% is pastures and 38.5% is used for alpine pastures.  Of the water in the municipality, 0.4% is in lakes and 0.4% is in rivers and streams.  Of the unproductive areas, 6.7% is unproductive vegetation and 2.7% is too rocky for vegetation.

The municipality is located in the upper Intyamon valley, and the Lake Lessoc storage tank on the Saan river is located in the municipality.

Coat of arms
The blazon of the municipal coat of arms is Gules a Bend wavy per bend wavy Sable and Argent and overall a Crane Argent on a Rock Vert.

Demographics
, 10.6% of the population are resident foreign nationals. Over the last 10 years (2000–2010) the population has changed at a rate of 6%. Migration accounted for 9.2%, while births and deaths accounted for -2.3%.

Most of the population speaks French (541 or 93.8%) as their first language, German is the second most common (23 or 4.0%) and English is the third (6 or 1.0%).  There is 1 person who speaks Italian and 1 person who speaks Romansh.

, the population was 51.3% male and 48.7% female.  The population was made up of 631 Swiss men (44.4% of the population) and 97 (6.8%) non-Swiss men.  There were 611 Swiss women (43.0%) and 81 (5.7%) non-Swiss women.  Of the population in the municipality, 288 or about 49.9% were born in Haut-Intyamon and lived there in 2000.  There were 162 or 28.1% who were born in the same canton, while 82 or 14.2% were born somewhere else in Switzerland, and 36 or 6.2% were born outside of Switzerland.

, children and teenagers (0–19 years old) make up 25.3% of the population, while adults (20–64 years old) make up 54.9% and seniors (over 64 years old) make up 19.8%.

, there were 246 people who were single and never married in the municipality.  There were 269 married individuals, 43 widows or widowers and 19 individuals who are divorced.

, there were 526 private households in the municipality, and an average of 2.4 persons per household.  There were 63 households that consist of only one person and 24 households with five or more people.  , a total of 215 apartments (72.4% of the total) were permanently occupied, while 58 apartments (19.5%) were seasonally occupied and 24 apartments (8.1%) were empty.  , the construction rate of new housing units was 2.1 new units per 1000 residents.  The vacancy rate for the municipality, was 1.42%.

Heritage sites of national significance
The Former Auberge De La Croix-Blanche À Montbovon, the Chalet d’alpage at En Lys 215, Farm House at Bellegardes 207 A, the fountain in Lessoc and the House de François Fracheboud are listed as Swiss heritage site of national significance.  The entire villages of Lessoc and Neirivue and the Montbovon area are all part of the Inventory of Swiss Heritage Sites.

Politics
In the 2011 federal election the most popular party was the SP which received 26.5% of the vote.  The next three most popular parties were the SVP (24.7%), the CVP (24.4%) and the FDP (10.4%).

The SPS improved their position in Haut-Intyamon rising to first, from second in 2007 (with 19.8%)  The SVP moved from third in 2007 (with 18.3%) to second in 2011, the CVP moved from first in 2007 (with 42.5%) to third and the FDP retained about the same popularity (9.4% in 2007).  A total of 494 votes were cast in this election, of which 8 or 1.6% were invalid.

Economy

, Haut-Intyamon had an unemployment rate of 1.8%.  , there were 83 people employed in the primary economic sector and about 33 businesses involved in this sector.  183 people were employed in the secondary sector and there were 16 businesses in this sector.  121 people were employed in the tertiary sector, with 30 businesses in this sector.  There were 276 residents of the municipality who were employed in some capacity, of which females made up 46.4% of the workforce.

 the total number of full-time equivalent jobs was 316.  The number of jobs in the primary sector was 55, of which 47 were in agriculture, 4 were in forestry or lumber production and 4 were in fishing or fisheries.  The number of jobs in the secondary sector was 175 of which 109 or (62.3%) were in manufacturing and 57 (32.6%) were in construction.  The number of jobs in the tertiary sector was 86.  In the tertiary sector; 9 or 10.5% were in wholesale or retail sales or the repair of motor vehicles, 6 or 7.0% were in the movement and storage of goods, 20 or 23.3% were in a hotel or restaurant, 1 was a technical professional or scientist, 15 or 17.4% were in education and 24 or 27.9% were in health care.

, there were 81 workers who commuted into the municipality and 155 workers who commuted away.  The municipality is a net exporter of workers, with about 1.9 workers leaving the municipality for every one entering.  Of the working population, 8.4% used public transportation to get to work, and 61.7% used a private car.

Transportation
Montbovon is on the meter gauge La Gruyere railway which operates the Chocolate Train and also provides passenger and freight services within its region. It connects to the Montreux-Oberland-Bernois (MOB) at Glion.

Religion

Of the rest of the population, there were 4 individuals (or about 0.69% of the population) who belonged to another Christian church.  34 (or about 5.89% of the population) belonged to no church, are agnostic or atheist, and 18 individuals (or about 3.12% of the population) did not answer the question.

Education
In Haut-Intyamon about 197 or (34.1%) of the population have completed non-mandatory upper secondary education, and 45 or (7.8%) have completed additional higher education (either university or a Fachhochschule).  Of the 45 who completed tertiary schooling, 53.3% were Swiss men, 28.9% were Swiss women, 13.3% were non-Swiss men.

The Canton of Fribourg school system provides one year of non-obligatory Kindergarten, followed by six years of Primary school.  This is followed by three years of obligatory lower Secondary school where the students are separated according to ability and aptitude.  Following the lower Secondary students may attend a three or four year optional upper Secondary school.  The upper Secondary school is divided into gymnasium (university preparatory) and vocational programs.  After they finish the upper Secondary program, students may choose to attend a Tertiary school or continue their apprenticeship.

During the 2010-11 school year, there were a total of 107 students attending 7 classes in Haut-Intyamon.  A total of 218 students from the municipality attended any school, either in the municipality or outside of it.  There were 2 kindergarten classes with a total of 26 students in the municipality.  The municipality had 5 primary classes and 81 students.  During the same year, there were no lower secondary classes in the municipality, but 46 students attended lower secondary school in a neighboring municipality.  There were no upper Secondary classes or vocational classes, but there were 14 upper Secondary students and 45 upper Secondary vocational students who attended classes in another municipality.  The municipality had no non-university Tertiary classes, but there were 5 non-university Tertiary students who attended classes in another municipality.

, there were 14 students in Haut-Intyamon who came from another municipality, while 78 residents attended schools outside the municipality.

References

External links

Cultural property of national significance in the canton of Fribourg